Alexander Binnie (born 1905; date of death unknown) was a Scottish football goalkeeper who played for Kilsyth Rangers, Partick Thistle, Port Vale, and Hamilton Academical in the 1920s.

Career
Binnie played for Kilsyth Rangers and Partick Thistle, before joining Port Vale on trial in September 1926. He kept a clean sheet in his debut in a draw with Hull City at Anlaby Road on 25 September, but failed to impress in his three other Second Division games. With goalkeepers George Holdcroft and Tom Fern already at The Old Recreation Ground there was no room for Binnie, and he moved back to Scotland to play for Hamilton Academical.

Career statistics
Source:

References

People from Kilsyth
Footballers from North Lanarkshire
Scottish footballers
Association football goalkeepers
Kilsyth Rangers F.C. players
Partick Thistle F.C. players
Port Vale F.C. players
Hamilton Academical F.C. players
Scottish Junior Football Association players
Scottish Football League players
English Football League players
1905 births
Year of death missing
20th-century deaths